The 1989 Senior League World Series took place from August 14–19 in Kissimmee, Florida, United States. Pingtung, Taiwan defeated Surrey, Canada twice in the championship game. It was Taiwan's second straight title. This was the final SLWS to feature 8 teams, a host team would be added in 1990.

Teams

Results

References

Senior League World Series
Senior League World Series
1989 in sports in Florida